Ctenucha virginica, the Virginia ctenucha, is a moth of the family Erebidae. The species was first described by Eugenius Johann Christoph Esper in 1794.

Morphology
The wing color varies from black to olive brown. The body is a metallic blue green. The head is yellow orange, with feathery antennae. The caterpillar (about 20–25 mm) has multiple tufts of white and yellow hair. It undergoes metamorphosis in May–August.

Range
It is endemic to eastern North America, from Newfoundland south to Virginia. According to the University of Alberta, there has been a westward expansion in the last 60 years as it has reached the Canadian Rockies and is now found in all Canadian provinces.

Food plants
Larvae feed on a variety of host plants including various grasses, irises, and sedges.
Adults drink nectar from flowers including goldenrod.

Images

Similar species
 Cisseps fulvicollis – yellow-collared scape moth
 Harrisina americana – grapeleaf skeletonizer

References

External links 

virginica
Moths of North America
Moths described in 1794